The following is a list of FCC-licensed radio stations in the U.S. state of Illinois, which can be sorted by their call signs, frequencies, cities of license, licensees, and programming formats.

List of radio stations

Defunct
 WAMV
 WCEV
 WCHI
 WCLM
 WENR
 WGEM

References

External links
 worldradiomap.com – List of radio stations in Chicago, Illinois

 
Illinois
Radio